Reflections – A Disney Lakeside Lodge was a planned Disney Vacation Club resort at the Walt Disney World Resort in Bay Lake, Florida. It was being built between Disney's Wilderness Lodge and Disney's Fort Wilderness Resort & Campground. It was being constructed on the former site of Disney's River Country Water Park. The new hotel was to feature several Disney characters for each of the rooms including Bambi, Brother Bear, The Fox and the Hound, and Pocahontas among others. A lakeside restaurant featuring the characters from The Princess and the Frog was also slated to open along with the new resort.

History
Walt Disney World Resort announced a new deluxe hotel and 16th vacation club property on October 18, 2018. The resort would include 900 rooms and club villas built on the shore of Bay Lake on the former site of Disney's River Country. The property was set to open in 2022, before being delayed.

At Destination D November 17, 2018, Disney Parks, Experiences and Products chairman Bob Chapek indicated the resort name as Reflections – A Disney Lakeside Lodge.

As of early 2020, the Reflections Project was full steam ahead, with construction & excavations taking place. Official artist impressions were released along with details about the resort. 

As of 2020, all references to the resort had been removed from Disney websites and digital press releases, suggesting that development of the resort had been either cancelled or postponed for a later date, likely due to the COVID-19 pandemic.

References

Reflections
Proposed buildings and structures in the United States
Disney Vacation Club